Changping station can refer to:
Changping station (Beijing Subway) (昌平), a subway station on Changping line of Beijing Subway
Changping railway station (Beijing) (昌平), a railway station in Beijing
Changping railway station (Guangdong) (常平), a railway station in Dongguan, Guangdong province
Changping station (Guangzhou Metro) (长平), a metro station on Line 21 of Guangzhou Metro, Guangdong province